Fethiye Belediyespor is the professional basketball club that represents Fethiye in professional basketball leagues.

History
The club was founded in 2000. After competing several season in lower divisions, the club promoted to TBL before 2019–20 season. Because of COVID-19 pandemic the season was cancelled, but before cancellation, they were in 2nd place after Petkim Spor.

At the start of 2020-21 season, after withdrawal of Teksüt Bandırma from Basketbol Süper Ligi, on September 18, 2020, TBF announced Fethiye Belediyespor will be the 16th team. This is the first season for the club at top-tier of Turkish basketball league system

Players

Current roster

External links

References

Basketball teams in Turkey
Basketball teams established in 2000
Fethiye